This is a list of lighthouses in El Salvador.

Lighthouses

See also
 Lists of lighthouses and lightvessels

References

External links
 

El Salvador
Lighthouses
Lighthouses